Leisure Painter is a learn-to-paint magazine, first published in 1967. It is published monthly by The Artists’ Publishing Company, based in Tenterden, Kent, and costs £4.99 from newsagents, supermarkets and art shops. The magazine's editor is Ingrid Lyon.

Leisure Painter magazine gives step-by-step tuition to beginners and amateur painters, as well as advice on drawing and painting. Art tutors - including David Bellamy, Pamela Kay and Tony Paul - set projects, describe their working methods, and offer tips and hints for readers.

The magazine's articles include practical instruction on drawing and painting in different media; competitions and special offers; monthly critiques of readers' work; questions from readers answered; reports by art tutors on art materials, products, books and DVDs; updates on open competitions, exhibitions and art-related events; and workshops and holidays in the UK and abroad tutored by professional artists.

The magazine's website, PaintersOnline, was launched in September 2007. PaintersOnline is an online community, including a forum for sharing experiences and advice; blogs; a gallery to upload images of visitors’ drawings and paintings; and a searchable database of art clubs and art tutors.

External links
 Leisure Painter magazine web site

1967 establishments in the United Kingdom
Visual arts magazines published in the United Kingdom
Monthly magazines published in the United Kingdom
Hobby magazines published in the United Kingdom
Magazines established in 1967
Mass media in Kent